Markos Tzoumaras (born 6 November 1939) is a Greek former sports shooter. He competed in the trap event at the 1968 Summer Olympics.

References

1939 births
Living people
Greek male sport shooters
Olympic shooters of Greece
Shooters at the 1968 Summer Olympics
Sportspeople from Athens
20th-century Greek people